The name Lev may be of different origins.

It is typically a first name, or less commonly a surname (e.g. in Czech Republic) of Slavic origin, (Cyrillic: Лев) which translates as "lion". Cf. Germanic form Löwe or Löw.

It is common with German Jews with Levite origins. Names like Leffmann, Levitz, Levy, Levi, etc. 

It is also a common Israeli surname and uncommon first name which translates as "heart" (לב, Loeb, Löb) in Hebrew. .

The name also appears in the forms , Lyev, Leo and Leon. 

People with this name include:

 Leo I of Galicia (Lev Danylovych in Ukrainian) (c. 1228–c. 1301), Knyaz (prince) of Belz, Peremyshl, Halych, Grand Prince of Kyiv and King of Galicia-Volhynia
 Lev Alburt (born 1945), chess Grandmaster and chess writer
 Lev Artsimovich (1909–1973), Soviet physicist
 Lev Berg (1876–1950), Soviet geographer, biologist and ichthyologist
 Lev Brovarskyi (1948–2009), Soviet football player and Ukrainian coach
 Lev Chernyi (died 1921), Russian individualist anarchist theorist, activist and poet
 Lev Dyomin (1926–1988), Soviet cosmonaut and Air Force colonel
 Lev Grossman (born 1969), American novelist and critic
 Lev Gumilyov (1912–1992), Soviet historian, ethnologist and anthropologist
 Lev Hakak (born 1944), Israeli-American academic, novelist and poet
 Lev Ivanov (1834–1901), Russian ballet dancer, choreographer and Second Balletmaster of the Imperial Ballet
 Lev Ivanov (football manager) (born 1967), Russian football manager
 Lev Korchebokov (1907–1971), Soviet football player and manager
 Lev Kamenev (1883–1936), Bolshevik revolutionary and Soviet politician
 Lev Kirshner (born 1969), American soccer player and coach
 Lev Kuleshov (1899–1970), Soviet filmmaker and film theorist
 Lev Khrshchonovich (1838–1907), chief architect of Kazan
 Lev Landau (1908–1968), Soviet physicist and Nobel laureate
 Lev Avnerovich Leviev (born 1956), Israeli businessman and philanthropist
 Lev Binzumovich Leviev (born 1984), Russian-Israeli Internet entrepreneur and investor
 Lev Loseff (1937–2009), Russian poet, literary critic, essayist and educator
 Lev Mei (1822–1862), Russian dramatist and poet
 Lev Naryshkin (1785–1846), Russian general in the Napoleonic Wars
 Lev Perovski (1792–1856), Russian count, mineralogist and Minister of Internal Affairs under Nicholas I
 Lev Pitaevskii (born 1933), Soviet theoretical physicist
 Lev Polugaevsky (1934–1995), Soviet grandmaster and author
 Lev Pontryagin (1908–1988), Soviet mathematician
 Lev Russov (1926–1987), Soviet painter, graphic artist and sculptor
 Lev Sedov (1906–1938), son of the Russian communist leader Leon Trotsky
 Lev Shatilo (born 1962), retired javelin thrower from the Soviet Union
 Lev Shcheglov (1946–2020), Russian physician
 Lev L. Spiro, American television and film director
 Lev Tolstoy (1828–1910), often translated as Leo Tolstoy, Russian author
 Lev Trotsky (Lev Davidovich Bronshteyn) (1879–1940), often translated as Leon Trotsky, Russian economist and revolutionary
 Lev Vladimirovich Urusov (1877–1933), Russian prince, diplomat and tennis player
 Lev Vygotsky (1896–1934), Soviet psychologist
 Lev Weinstein (1916–2004), Soviet world champion and Olympic bronze medalist in shooting
 Lev Yashin (1929–1990), Soviet-Russian football goalkeeper
 Lev Yilmaz (born 1973), American independent filmmaker, artist and publisher
 Lev Zadov (1893–1938), Ukrainian counter-intelligence agent

See also
 Liev Schreiber (born 1967), American actor
 Lew (given name)

References

Slavic masculine given names
Russian masculine given names